Bernd Hebecker (born 5 October 1955) is a German former professional darts player who has played in the British Darts Organisation (BDO) and World Darts Federation (WDF) events. He is the first player from Germany who qualified for the World Darts Championship and took medal at the WDF Europe Cup.

Career
Hebecker is the first full-time professional darts player, who start playing darts in the Bremen Broadway Pub in 1977 at the age of 22. The start of the first league in Bremen and other German cities soon followed, as well as the organization of the first German Championship in the early 1980s. In the 1980s he drew attention to himself with his first national titles. He belonged to the first national Germany team during the 1983 WDF World Cup. He lost in the first round match to Hiroshi Watanobe by 3–4 in legs. In the pairs and team competitions the Germans did not manage to achieve satisfactory results. In total, Hebecker represented Germany three times during the WDF World Cup and five times during the WDF Europe Cup.

After winning the German Championship in 1984, Hebecker won the German Open, Dortmund Open and being a two-time Champion of the German Gold Cup. In 1984 and 1985 he also served as President of the Deutschen Dart-Verbandes, making him one of the pioneers of darts in Germany. In 1992, he won a bronze medal in singles competition at the 1992 WDF Europe Cup in Kerava. On the way to his first and only medal, he defeated Leo Laurens, Jocky Wilson, Øyvind Aasland and Bruno Ladovaz. He finally lost in semi-finals to John Lowe by 3–4 in legs.

After good performance at the British Open, he was the first player from Germany to qualify for the 1993 BDO World Darts Championship. There he lost to Jann Hoffmann in the first round by 0–3 in sets. Between 1996 and 1999 Hebecker turned his hobby into a career and played the entire British Darts Organisation tour as a professional player. He refused to compete in Professional Darts Corporation tournaments and retired in 2000.

World Championship results

BDO
 1993: First round (lost to Jann Hoffmann 0–3) (sets)

Performance timeline

References

1955 births
Living people
German darts players